The Slovenian Association of Actuaries is the association of actuaries in Slovenia. The association was founded on 30 January 1997. It is a full member of the International Actuarial Association and the Groupe Consultatif. As of 2007, the association has about 60 members, 37 of them fully qualified. The current chairman of the association is Darko Medved.

External links
 Slovenian Association of Actuaries official website

Actuarial associations
Non-profit organizations based in Slovenia
1997 establishments in Slovenia